Sandy Scordo (born 25 July 1985) is a French karateka. She is a two-time silver medalist at the World Karate Championships in the women's individual kata event, both in 2012 and in 2014.

Career 

She won one of the bronze medals in the women's kata event at the 2009 European Karate Championships held in Zagreb, Croatia. She won the silver medal in this event at the European Karate Championships in 2010, 2011 and 2012. She won one of the bronze medals in this event in 2013 and 2014.

At the 2013 World Games held in Cali, Colombia, she won the gold medal in the women's kata event. In the same year, she also won the gold medal in the women's kata event at the 2013 World Combat Games held in Saint Petersburg, Russia.

In 2015, she won the silver medal in the women's kata event at the European Games held in Baku, Azerbaijan. In the final, she lost against Sandra Sánchez of Spain.

In 2017, she won the bronze medal in the women's kata event at the World Games held in Wrocław, Poland. In the bronze medal match, she defeated Sakura Kokumai of the United States.

Achievements

References

External links 
 

Living people
1985 births
Place of birth missing (living people)
French female karateka
European Games silver medalists for France
Karateka at the 2015 European Games
European Games medalists in karate
Competitors at the 2013 World Games
Competitors at the 2017 World Games
World Games gold medalists
World Games bronze medalists
World Games medalists in karate
21st-century French women